WGEA (1150 AM) was a radio station licensed to serve Geneva, Alabama.  Established in 1953, the station was owned by Shelley Broadcasting Company, Inc.  It aired a talk radio format.

The station was assigned the WGEA call letters by the Federal Communications Commission.

Notable programming included a morning show with local host Clayton Flick plus local high school sporting events and national shows from syndicated hosts Bill Bennett, Mike Gallagher, Dennis Prager, Michael Medved and Mark Levin.

History
WGEA was put on the air on March 17, 1953, by three brothers - Howard, Clarence and Alton Scott, who owned The Geneva County Reaper. Senator John Sparkman and Governor Gordon Persons attended the formal opening ceremony on April 2, 1953. The station was called, "Voice of the Geneva County Reaper". In the late 1950s, WGEA was purchased by Radio South, owned by Miles and Celeste Ferguson.

In 1962 a group of local businessmen formed Geneva County Broadcasting Company and bought the station. WGEA-FM (now WPHH in Hope Hull) was launched on June 27, 1969. The FM station was largely programmed separately but did simulcast some popular local news programs in the morning hours. James C. Helms was the General Manager from 1962 until his death in 1980 at which time his wife Joan assumed his position and became one of the first female General Managers in Alabama radio.

In 1987, WGEA and WGEA-FM were sold to Shelley Broadcasting Company, owned by H. Jack Mizell of Ozark, Alabama. He changed the call letters of the FM station to WRJM-FM and moved its studios to Ozark. Doc Parker became General Manager of the AM station and also hosted "The Breakfast Club", a popular local morning program, until he retired in 2015. WRJM-FM was sold in a bank foreclosure in 2008, but Mizell continued to own and operate WGEA until April 11, 2017, when the Federal Communications Commission canceled the station's license for failure to pay debts that it owed to the commission.

On June 6, 2019 the FCC rescinded the station deletion, and continued operation of WGEA was approved. However, WGEA was again deleted on September 10, 2019.

References

External links
FCC Station Search Details: DWGEA (Facility ID: 60100)
  (covering 1952-1980)

GEA
Defunct radio stations in the United States
Geneva County, Alabama
Radio stations established in 1953
1953 establishments in Alabama
Radio stations disestablished in 2017
2017 disestablishments in Alabama
GEA